Noveleta, officially the Municipality of Noveleta, formerly known as Tierra Alta during the Spanish colonial era, is a 3rd class municipality in the province of Cavite, Philippines. According to the 2020 census, it has a population of 49,452 people.

With the continuous expansion of Metro Manila, the municipality is now included in the Manila built-up area which reaches Lipa City in its southernmost part.

History
Noveleta was originally a barrio of the municipality of Kawit (Cavite El Viejo) and some part of Cavite City (Dalahican). It was made an independent pueblo on January 5, 1868, by Gen. Jose dela Gandera y Navarro. Ironically, Noveleta was referred to by the Spaniards as Tierra Alta meaning higher ground in view of the fact that it was more elevated than Cavite la Punta (now Cavite City). The name Noveleta is said to have originated from Nueva Isla or (new island), a tern frequently used by the Spaniards, referring to the locality. In the early years of the Spanish regime visiting priests described the place as Nueva Late (New fate or Fortune). In the course of time these terms Nueva Isla and Nueva Lete involved of Noveleta.

But one legend tells the story of a beautiful maiden named Violeta who was betrothed by her father to a Spanish officer against her will. The unhappy girl, who was already engaged to a young Katipunero, committed suicide on the eve of her wedding to the Spaniard. The Spanish officer cried in deep anguish for the loss of his love, Madre de Dios, no Violeta!  The phrase  No Violeta eventually became Noveleta.

Noveleta has the distinction of leading a pivotal role in the Philippine revolutionary activities in Cavite. It used to be the seat of the Magdiwang Council of the Katipunan, the counterpart of the Magdalo Council under Gen. Emilio Aguinaldo in Kawit town (then Cavite el Viejo). The capture of the Noveleta Tribunal on August 31, 1896, was led by Gen. Mariano Alvarez, founder and president of the Sangguniang Bayan Magdiwang. Its revolutionary name is Magdiwang, meaning to celebrate a momentous event. The revolution against the Spanish colonialism produced five brave and able military generals and tacticians from Noveleta in the persons of Gen. Mariano Alvarez, Gen. Santiago Alvarez (Son of Mariano), Gen. Pascual Alvarez (Cousin of Pascual), Gen. Luciano San Miguel. He was the Last President of the Philippine Revolutionary Government after the capture of Gen. Mariano Trias (First Vice President of the Phlippines) and Gen. Miguel Malvar of Batangas. Another hero is Gen. Ariston Villanueva who together with Gen. Santiago Alvarez emerged as the hero of the Battle of Calero.

Geography
Noveleta is the smallest municipality of the Cavite province. The municipality is bordered on the north by Cavite City, on the west by Manila Bay and Rosario. It is flanked by General Trias on the south and Kawit on the east.

Land area
Noveleta has a total land area of 16.43 km2, which is roughly 5.41% of the total land area of the province of Cavite. The municipality has 16 barangays. Based on the 2007 Annual Report of the Municipality, the major land use include, residential, agricultural, saltbeds and fishponds and industrial.

Barangays
Noveleta is politically subdivided into 16 barangays.

Climate

Demographics

Religion

Christianity
The majority of the people of Noveleta are Roman Catholic, Aglipayan Church is the second majority and third is Iglesia Ni Cristo but there has been fast growth of other Protestant denominations including Members Church of God International, Baptist, Pentecostal, Mormonism, Jehovah's Witness and Born Again Christian.

Islam
With the influx of migrants from other provinces especially from Mindanao other non-Christian faiths particularly Islam is practiced in the town.

Other faiths
Non-Abrahamic faiths include native-Tagalog Anitism, Animism and with the local Indian communities Hinduism are followed.

Irreligious and atheist
A small minority of residents who class themselves as irreligious, agnostic or atheist also reside peacefully alongside people of faith; demonstrating the diverse and tolerant attitude towards personal or group belief in the town.

Economy 

The agricultural sector in Noveleta centers on crop production, fishery, livestock and poultry raising. Fishery is a major source of livelihood in the municipality. Around 100 hectares are utilized for aquaculture and fishpond activities, most of which are in Barangay San Rafael II, III, and IV. The main products of Noveleta include milkfish, prawns, crabs, tilapia, mussels and oysters. The fishponds are converted to saltbeds during the dry season. A big enterprise, which spurs the output in the service sector, is the presence of the Noveca Industries in Barangay Santa Rosa II. Manufacturing is limited to light and medium industries such as sash factories and several garment factories. Other activities are the manufacture of furniture, iron gates and grills, and hollowblocks. The construction boom, on the other hand, is due to the mushrooming of residential subdivisions in the area. A number of commercial establishments are located along Noveleta's major thoroughfares. Small retail stores, service firms, and some medium scale enterprises, dot the municipality. There are specialty stores engaged in the trade of construction supplies and materials, auto parts, furniture and home decors, sportswear as well as fresh food items like meat, fruits and vegetables. Also based in the town are three pharmacies, eleven bakeries and two gasoline stations. The tourism industry in Noveleta relies mainly on its coastline with Manila Bay bordering its western portion. Restaurants, cottages, conference rooms, and social halls/pavilions are situated along the beaches of Barangay San Rafael III and IV.

Communication 
The Philippine Postal Corporation manages one post office situated in the municipal building. The Bureau of Telecommunications of the Department of Transportation and Communication presently operates its office at the Old Noveleta Tribunal. PLDT, Globe and Digitel Telephone Company provide telephone services in the municipality.

Banking 
Five banks operating in the town of Noveleta are GSIS Family Bank, Bank of the Philippine Islands (BPI) Family Bank, the Unlad Rural Bank of Noveleta, the Luzon Development Bank and the Rizal Commercial Banking Corporation (RCBC). There are other financial institutions in the area extending credit for investment ventures.

Investments 
The agricultural activities in the municipality are gradually decreasing due to urbanization. The current trend in Noveleta is in conversion of land from agriculture use to urban settlements. This may be attributed to its growing population and its proximity to Metro Manila and the Cavite Economic Processing Zone in Rosario, a 10-minurte drive from Noveleta. Majority of Noveleta's population is involved in commercial and industrial activities. Historical and tourism landmarks include the Noveleta Tribunal, Calero Bridge, Villamar Beach Resort I, Villamar Beach Resort II, Lido Beach Resort, TIP Beach Resort and the New Noveleta Cockpit Arena. The strips of beaches in Noveleta combined with the town's proximity to major urban centers make it an ideal tourist attraction. Noveleta is included in the "Manila Build-up Area" which makes it ideal for housing and commercial developments. It is only 3 kilometers from Cavitex exit and also 3 kilometers to Sangley Point in Cavite City, the next International Airport.

Infrastructure

Transportation
Noveleta is best accessed through jeeps, and mini buses that frequently ply its major thoroughfares, specifically the roads that lead to Rosario, Bacoor, and Cavite City. Tricycles and pedicabs service the tight and cool backroads of the municipality.

Electricity
The Manila Electric Company (Meralco) distributes the power supply of Noveleta from the Luzon Grid of the National Power Corporation (NPC).

Water supply
The Metropolitan Waterworks System in Noveleta provides the water requirement of Noveleta.
But majority of the people in Noveleta uses Deep Well, specially on the remote area where the waterworks can't reach.

Education 
There are 39 schools in the municipality.

Public primary schools
Noveleta Central Elementary School
Ambrocio S. Robles Memorial Elementary School
San Antonio Elementary School
Gen. Luciano San Miguel Elementary School
Salcedo Elementary School
Pacifico O. Aquino Elementary School
San Juan Elementary School

Public secondary school

Noveleta National High School
Noveleta Senior High School

Private schools

Abraham's Flock Christian Academy
Atheneum School
Gospel Light Christian Academy
Saint Therese Catholic School
Holy Cross Catholic School
Montgard Learning Center
Unida Nehemiah Christian Academy
Patnubay Academy

College

Columbia College and Computer Technology Center
Mother Theresa Colegio de Noveleta
Cavite State University- Noveleta Campus

Healthcare
Noveleta has ten government health centers and one private clinic as of 1996. There is one private medical hospital located at Salcedo II. The municipality also has three ambulances to support the medical practitioners in responding to the needs of the populace.

Government

Elected officials
The following are the elected officials of the town elected last May 13, 2019 which serves until 2022:

References

External links

Noveleta at the Official Website of Cavite Province
[ Philippine Standard Geographic Code]
Philippine Census Information

Municipalities of Cavite
Populated places on Manila Bay